The Black Tiger Spring 
() is a culturally 
significant artesian karst spring located in 
the city of Jinan, Shandong Province, 
China. The spring is ranked as the second most significant among 
the 72 named springs in Jinan (after the Baotu Spring). The water 
of the spring stems from moderately-deep circulation and emerges from a water-filled limestone cave in a 
steep cliff. From the mouth of the cave, the water is funneled to flow 
out of the mouths of three ornamental stone-carved tiger heads into a 
square-shaped spring pool. From there it runs into the old city moat, 
next to which the spring is located. According to the tradition, there 
was a black rock lying in front of the cave in ancient times. The name of the spring is 
said to be derived from the shape and color of the rock, which 
resembled a black tiger, and the sound of the water gushing past the 
rock being reminiscent of the roar of a tiger. The ancient layout of 
the spring is described in a poem by the Ming Dynasty poet, Yan 
Bizeng.

Location
The Black Tiger Spring is located on the south bank of the old city 
moat, close to the southeastern corner of the moat. A bit to the east, 
on the opposite site of the moat stands the Liberation Pavilion that 
commemorates the arrival of the victorious People's Liberation Army in Jinan.

See also
List of sites in Jinan

References
  
 

Bodies of water of Shandong
Springs of China